Abbotsham Road railway station was a small railway station on the independent Bideford, Westward Ho! and Appledore Railway in the English county of Devon. It lay 2 miles and 50 chains from Bideford Quay.

History
Previously named Mudcott, the station was in open countryside at the Mudcott Road level crossing. It was known as Mudcott Passing Loop until the passenger platforms were brought into use.

Infrastructure
It had a passing loop, two wooden platforms and what appears to have been a ticket office come signal box hut. No freight facilities were provided. The signal box was probably connected by phone to the signal boxes at Bideford Yard and The Causeway.

Christie records that the railway company had built a path to allow volunteers from the local militia in Bideford to walk to their nearby rifle range and that this was "a pretty station in the midst of trees."

See also
Appledore station
Northam station
Westward Ho! railway station

References

Sources

External links
Outline history of the railway

Disused railway stations in Devon
Former Bideford, Westward Ho! and Appledore Railway stations
Railway stations in Great Britain opened in 1901
Railway stations in Great Britain closed in 1917
Torridge District